The Long Beach–San Pedro Line is a former Pacific Electric interurban railway service in Los Angeles County, California. Unlike most of the company's services, trains did not travel to Downtown Los Angeles and instead provided a service between Long Beach and San Pedro. It was designated as line 9.

History
Direct service between Long Beach and San Pedro commenced on June 25, 1910. In 1917 the line was rerouted in Long Beach via Third Street, Pine Avenue, Ocean Avenue, Morgan, a private right-of-way, and a reverse move to Wilmington. Further rerouting in 1921 had the line crossing the Los Angeles River on Seventh Street after the river's new cement channel was constructed. Service was again rerouted starting February 15, 1942, this time to avoid the bascule bridge which was closed due to World War II. Passenger operations ceased after January 2, 1941.

Route

After departing Long Beach via the Seventh Street Bridge (since demolished), the line turned north, running on the west bank of the Los Angeles River before turning westward just south of Anaheim Street. The tracks crossed Anaheim Street obliquely and continued west before crossing two Southern Pacific steam lines before joining the San Pedro via Dominguez Line.

A spur line ran up Daisy Avenue, usually only served by a single passenger round trip to maintain the franchise.

List of major stations

References

External links
 1943 Timetable

Pacific Electric routes
Light rail in California
Railway services introduced in 1910
1910 establishments in California
Railway services discontinued in 1941
1941 disestablishments in California
Closed railway lines in the United States